Jules Cluzel (born 12 October 1988 in Montluçon, Allier) is a French motorcycle racer. In 2019 he competes in the Supersport World Championship riding a Yamaha YZF-R6. He scored his first ever Grand Prix victory at Silverstone in Moto2 in 2010.

Career statistics

Grand Prix motorcycle racing

Races by year
(key) (Races in bold indicate pole position; races in italics indicate fastest lap)

Supersport World Championship

Races by year
(key) (Races in bold indicate pole position; races in italics indicate fastest lap)

 Season still in progress.

Superbike World Championship

Races by year
(key) (Races in bold indicate pole position; races in italics indicate fastest lap)

References

External links

1988 births
Living people
People from Montluçon
French motorcycle racers
250cc World Championship riders
125cc World Championship riders
Supersport World Championship riders
Moto2 World Championship riders
Superbike World Championship riders
Sportspeople from Allier